Langs de Vecht en d'oude Rijnstroom is the provincial anthem of Utrecht, Netherlands. Its text was written in 1952 by the provincial employee J. Küppers, on the melody of "Angels from the Realms of Glory" of the British 19th-century composer Henry Smart.

Lyrics

Culture of Utrecht (province)
Regional songs
Dutch anthems
1952 in the Netherlands
1952 songs